Yvan Deslavière (born 28 May 1973) is a French rower. He competed in the men's quadruple sculls event at the 2000 Summer Olympics.

References

External links
 

1973 births
Living people
French male rowers
Olympic rowers of France
Rowers at the 2000 Summer Olympics
Rowers from Paris